Beningbrough Hall is a large Georgian mansion near the village of Beningbrough, North Yorkshire, England, and overlooks the River Ouse.

It has baroque interiors, cantilevered stairs, wood carving and central corridors which run the length of the house. Externally the house is a red-brick Georgian mansion with a grand drive running to the main frontage and a walled garden, The house is home to more than 100 portraits on loan from the National Portrait Gallery. It has a restaurant, shop and garden shop, and was shortlisted in 2010 for the Guardian Family Friendly Museum Award.

The Hall is set in extensive grounds and is separated from them by an example of a ha-ha (a sunken wall) to prevent sheep and cattle entering the Hall's gardens or the Hall itself.

History
Local builder William Thornton oversaw the construction, but Beningbrough's designer remains a mystery; possibly it was Thomas Archer. Bourchier was High Sheriff of Yorkshire for 1719–1721 and died in 1736 at the age of 52.

John Bourchier (1710–1759) followed his father as owner of Beningbrough Hall and was High Sheriff in 1749. It then passed to Dr. Ralph Bourchier, a  71-year-old physician and from him to his daughter, Margaret, who lived there for 70 years. Today a Bourchier knot is cut into a lawn adjoining the house.

After over 100 years in the Bourchiers' possession, the estate passed in 1827 to the Rev. William Henry Dawnay, the future 6th Viscount Downe, a distant relative. He died in 1846 and left the house to his second son, Payan, who was High Sheriff for 1851. The house was neglected, prompting fears that it might have to be demolished. In 1916, however, a wealthy heiress, Enid Scudamore-Stanhope, Countess of Chesterfield, bought it and immediately set about its restoration, filling it with furnishings and paintings from her ancestral home, Holme Lacy in Herefordshire.

During the Second World War the hall was occupied by the Royal Air Force then latterly, the Royal Canadian Air Force, when under No. 6 Group of Bomber Command, they took over some of the bases in the region (such as the nearby RAF Linton-on-Ouse and RAF Leeming).

Lady Chesterfield died in 1957, and in June 1958 the estate was acquired by the National Trust after it had been accepted by the government in lieu of death duties at a cost of £29,250. In partnership with the National Portrait Gallery the hall exhibits more than a hundred 18th-century portraits and has seven new interpretation galleries called 'Making Faces: 18th-century Style'. Outside the main building there is a Victorian laundry and a walled garden with fruit and vegetable planting, the produce from which is used by the walled garden restaurant.

Beningbrough Hall includes a wilderness play area, community orchard, an Italianate border and garden shop. It hosts events, activity days, family art workshops, and an annual food and craft festival which in 2010 was a Big Green Festival.

See also
 Bourchier knot, a heraldic representation of the Granny knot or Reef knot used by the Bourchier family.

References

Sources

Further reading

External links

National Trust page
Beningbrough Hall page on National Portrait Gallery website

Wikidata list of paintings at Beningbrough

Country houses in North Yorkshire
National Trust properties in North Yorkshire
Grade I listed buildings in North Yorkshire
Grade I listed houses
Art museums and galleries in North Yorkshire
Historic house museums in North Yorkshire
Dawnay family